Spring Brook is a river located in central Otsego County, New York. The creek drains Arnold Lake and flows south before converging with Goodyear Lake, which is an impoundment of the Susquehanna River, by Portlandville, New York.

References

Rivers of New York (state)
Rivers of Otsego County, New York